My Dead Body is a 2009 pulp-noir / horror novel by American writer Charlie Huston. It is the fifth novel in the Joe Pitt Casebooks, following Every Last Drop. The series follows the life of the New York vampyre Joe Pitt, who works sometimes as an enforcer for various vampyre factions in New York and sometimes as a sort of detective.

Plot summary
My Dead Body brings the story arc of the preceding four books of the Joe Pitt series to a close, as the rival vampyre factions of Manhattan Island face off.

Characters

External links

 Author Charlie Huston's Official Website and Blog

2000s horror novels
2009 American novels
Contemporary fantasy novels
American horror novels
Novel series
American thriller novels
American vampire novels
Novels set in Manhattan
Del Rey books